The two Serenades, Op. 11 and 16, represent early efforts by Johannes Brahms to write orchestral music. They both date from after the 1856 death of Robert Schumann when Brahms was residing in Detmold and had access to an orchestra.

Brahms had a goal of reaching Ludwig van Beethoven's level in writing symphonies, and worked long and hard on his  first symphony, completing it only in 1876 when he was 43 years old. As preliminary steps in composing for orchestra, he chose early on to write some lighter orchestral pieces, these Serenades. The second was first sent to Clara Schumann, who was delighted by it.

Serenade No. 1 in D, Op. 11

The first serenade was completed in 1858. At that time, Brahms was also working on his Piano Concerto No. 1. Originally scored for wind and string nonet and then expanded into a longer work for chamber orchestra, the serenade was later adapted for orchestra; Brahms completed the final version for large orchestra in December 1859. In the orchestration of the Concerto Brahms had solicited and got a great deal of advice from his good friend Joseph Joachim. For this  Serenade Joachim also gave advice, although to a lesser extent. The first performance of the Serenade, in Hanover on 3 March 1860, "did not go very well" in Brahms's opinion, but evidently the unusually large audience of 1,200 did not notice any mistake during the performance. At the end, applause "persisted until I came out and down in front." After every piece in the concert "the audience was shouting." This was a vastly better reception than the Piano Concerto had in either of its first two performances. But at its third performance, 24 March, also in Hamburg, it had been a success, perhaps not to the same degree as the Serenade. 

The Serenade consists of six movements and lasts around 45 minutes.

Scorings for Serenade 1 are:
 Nonet: flute, 2 clarinets in A (movements I, V, VI) and B flat (movements II, III, IV), bassoon, horn, violin, viola, cello, double bass
 Orchestra: 2 flutes, 2 oboes, 2 clarinets (as in the nonet}, 2 bassoons, 4 horns, 2 trumpets, timpani, strings (violins I and II, viola, cello, double bass)

Serenade No. 2 in A, Op. 16

The second serenade was written in 1859 and dedicated to Clara Schumann. The first public performance, reportedly for full orchestra (version lost?), was in Hamburg on 10 February 1860.

Brahms himself reworked the piece for piano 4 hands in 1875. The same year he revisited the orchestral version, this time for chamber orchestra. The new scoring was for piccolo, 2 flutes, 2 oboes, 2 clarinets (in A for movements I, IV , V); in C for movement II; and in B flat for movement III), 2 bassoons, 2 horns, violas, cellos, and double basses, omitting violins, brass, and percussion. 

The five movements take approximately thirty minutes to perform.

Notes 

Sources

External links

Compositions by Johannes Brahms
Brahms
1857 compositions
1859 compositions
Compositions in A major
Compositions in D major

de:1. Serenade (Brahms)